Demerio Houston  (born September 3, 1996) is a professional Canadian football defensive back for the Winnipeg Blue Bombers of the Canadian Football League (CFL).

College career 
Houston played college football for the Southern Jaguars from 2015 to 2018.

Professional career 
On October 22, 2019, Houston signed a futures contract for the 2020 season with the Winnipeg Blue Bombers. However, the 2020 CFL season was cancelled and he did not play in 2020.

Houston began the 2021 season on the practice roster following training camp, but made his professional debut on October 15, 2021, against the Edmonton Elks, where he had three defensive tackles. He played in four regular season games for the team where he had seven defensive tackles and three special teams tackles. He was placed back on the practice roster for the post-season as the Blue Bombers won the 108th Grey Cup and Houston became a Grey Cup champion in his rookie year.

In 2022, Houston made the team's active roster following training camp and played as a backup for the Blue Bombers' first two games. Following an injury to Winston Rose, he started at cornerback in the third game where his six-tackle performance made veteran Tyquwan Glass expendable, who was released in favour of keeping Houston in the starting lineup. Two weeks later, on July 9, 2022, he recorded his first career interception on a pass from Michael O'Connor in a game against the BC Lions. In the following week, on July 15, 2022, he recorded a victory-clinching, diving interception in the final minute of the game against the Calgary Stampeders.

Personal life 
Houston and his wife, Ashley, have three children, Hi'Lynn, Jace, and Campbell.

References

External links 
Winnipeg Blue Bombers bio 

1996 births
Living people
American football defensive backs
American players of Canadian football
Canadian football defensive backs
People from Shelby, North Carolina
Players of Canadian football from North Carolina
Southern Jaguars football players
Winnipeg Blue Bombers players